Macy is a former unincorporated community in northern Hardin County, in the U.S. state of Iowa.

Geography

History

Macy's post office opened on August 5, 1893. The population of the community was just 12 in 1902. 

The Macy post office was discontinued on February 14, 1914.

Macy's population was 25 in 1940.

The railroad tracks and associated buildings are still located in Macy.

See also
Secor, Iowa

References

External links
 Iowa Digital Heritage: Macy, Iowa - Includes historic photos of Macy, Iowa

Unincorporated communities in Hardin County, Iowa
Unincorporated communities in Iowa